At the 1904 Summer Olympics of St. Louis, Missouri, eleven gymnastics events were contested for the first time.

The 1904 Games had a program of events spread out over several months, and the gymnastics competition was no different.  The International Olympic Committee considers two sets of events as "Olympic":
International Turners' Championship held July 1–2, comprising the all-around, triathlon, and team events
Olympic Gymnastics Championships held October 29, comprising the seven individual apparatus events and the combined event.

The individual all-around was a combination of the gymnastic triathlon competition and the athletics triathlon.  The team competition was a combination of individual scores from the individual all-around.
The parallel bars, horizontal bar, vault, and pommel horse scores for each gymnast were summed to get the combined score.

Medal summary

Participating nations
119 gymnasts from 4 nations competed.

Medal table

References

Citations

Sources 

 
 

 
1904
1904 Summer Olympics events
1904 in gymnastics